Several ships have been named :

 JDS Kaya (PF-288), a Kusu-class patrol frigate of the Japan Maritime Self-Defense Force, formerly USS San Pedro (PF-37)

See also 
 Kaya (disambiguation)

Imperial Japanese Navy ship names
Japanese Navy ship names